Solomon Islands was to compete at the 2020 Summer Paralympics in Tokyo, Japan, from 24 August to 5 September 2021, but ultimately the team withdrew from competition. The delegation was still represented by a volunteer at the 2020 Summer Paralympics Parade of Nations.

Taekwondo

Solomon Islands qualified two athletes to compete at the Paralympics competition. Solomon Jagiri & Jeminah Otoa qualified by winning the gold medal at the 2020 Oceanian Qualification Tournament in Gold Coast, Australia.

References 

2020
Nations at the 2020 Summer Paralympics
2021 in Solomon Islands sport